Sylvia Stone (1928 – 2011) was a Canadian artist. Her work is included in the collections of the Whitney Museum of American Art and the Smithsonian American Art Museum.

Biography 
Stone was born in 1928 in Toronto, Ontario. She had two older sisters. When she was two years old, Stone, her siblings, and her mother left Stone's father. Her mother was unable to support her children on her own. Stone was subsequently sent to Children's Aid homes while her sisters were sent to help on local farms. At the age of six, Stone was placed back with her mother and sisters. The Great Depression severely impacted the family, and they were forced to move several times. It was during this time that Stone began to draw.

Stone went to a high school for the arts called Central Tech. During this period she lived alone, as her sisters married and her mother had moved out west. Her mother sent her rent money during this time, and after school Stone worked at Woolworth's. At the age of sixteen, Stone was forced to start working full time in order to support herself. She often worked night shifts in order to still go to school during the day.

At the age of twenty-two Stone married and had a child. She continued to practice art during this time, which displeased her husband's family. This ultimately led to their divorce. During this time Stone studied with Harry Sternberg, Morris Kanto, and Vyclav Vytlacil.

In 1959, Stone first met the painter Al Held. The two married ten years later in 1969. They divorced in 1986.

Her image is included in the iconic 1972 poster  Some Living American Women Artists by Mary Beth Edelson.

References

1928 births

2011 deaths
Artists from Toronto

20th-century Canadian women artists
20th-century Canadian artists
21st-century Canadian women artists
21st-century Canadian artists
Canadian emigrants to the United States